The Utica Mansion is a historic house located at 1103 Bush St. in Angels Camp, California. Built in 1882, the house was originally a two-story stone building designed in the Federal style. Robert Leeper, then owner of the Utica Mine, built the house next to the Utica Mill. Leeper sold the mine to C. D. Lane in 1884; he sold the house to Lane four years later. Lane and two other investors began to buy up mining claims in Angels Camp, and their enterprise soon became profitable. With his investment earnings, Lane began to expand the Utica Mansion. Lane added a two-story addition to the west and north sides of the house and a veranda on the other two sides. He also improved the interior furnishings by adding new wallpaper and fireplaces with English tiles, repainting the woodwork, adding gold moldings to hanging pictures, and installing Axminster carpets. Lane lived in the house until 1895, when he left to pursue an investment in Alaskan mining.

The Utica Mansion was added to the National Register of Historic Places on May 31, 1984.

References

External links

Houses on the National Register of Historic Places in California
Houses completed in 1882
Houses in Calaveras County, California
Federal architecture in California
National Register of Historic Places in Calaveras County, California